Samantha Stosur was the defending champion but lost in the quarterfinals to Dominika Cibulková.

Anastasia Pavlyuchenkova won the title, defeating Cibulková in the final, 6–7(5–7), 7–6(7–3), 7–6(8–6). Pavlyuchenkova won the title after saving two match points Cibulková had in the final against her.

Seeds

Draw

Finals

Top half

Bottom half

Qualifying

Seeds

Qualifiers

Lucky losers

First qualifier

Second qualifier

Third qualifier

Fourth qualifier

Fifth qualifier

Sixth qualifier

References
Main Draw
Qualifying Draw

Internationaux de Strasbourg - Singles
2018 Singles